The Apulian regional election of 1980 took place on 8 June 1980.

Events
Christian Democracy was by far the largest party, while the Italian Communist Party came distantly second. After the election Nicola Quarta, the incumbent Christian Democratic President, formed a new centre-left government (Organic Centre-left). In 1983 Quarta was replaced by Gennaro Trisorio Liuzzi, a Christian Democrat who had already served as President of the Region from 1970 to 1975.

Results

Source: Ministry of the Interior

Elections in Apulia
1980 elections in Italy